Malacoctenus versicolor, the Barfin blenny, is a species of labrisomid blenny native to the western Atlantic Ocean and the Caribbean Sea from southern Florida through the Antilles. This species can reach a length of  TL.

References

versicolor
Fish of the Caribbean
Fish described in 1876